Clwyd West is a constituency of the Senedd. It elects one Member of the Senedd by the first past the post method of election. Also, however, it is one of nine constituencies in the North Wales electoral region, which elects four additional members, in addition to nine constituency members, to produce a degree of proportional representation for the region as a whole.

Boundaries 

The constituency was created for the first election to the Assembly, in 1999, with the name and boundaries of the Clwyd West Westminster constituency. 
It is entirely within the preserved county of Clwyd.
For the 2007 Assembly election part of Clwyd West was transferred to the Vale of Clwyd constituency, and Clwyd West now includes an area currently within the Clwyd South constituency.
For Westminster purposes, the same boundary changes became effective for the 2010 United Kingdom general election.

As created in 1999, the North Wales region included the constituencies of Alyn and Deeside, Caernarfon, Clwyd West, Clwyd South, Conwy, Delyn, Vale of Clwyd, Wrexham and Ynys Môn. 
After the 2007 Assembly election the region now includes Aberconwy, Alyn and Deeside, Arfon, Clwyd South, Clwyd West, Delyn, Vale of Clwyd, Wrexham and Ynys Môn.

Voting
In elections for the Senedd, each voter has two votes. The first vote may be used to vote for a candidate to become the Member of the Senedd for the voter's constituency, elected by the first past the post system. The second vote may be used to vote for a regional closed party list of candidates. Additional member seats are allocated from the lists by the d'Hondt method, with constituency results being taken into account in the allocation.

Assembly members and Members of the Senedd

Elections

Elections in the 2020s

Elections in the 2010s 

Regional ballots rejected: 159

Elections in the 2000s 

2003 Electorate: 54,463
Regional ballots rejected: 344

Elections in the 1990s

Notes

References 

Clwyd
Senedd constituencies in the North Wales electoral region
1999 establishments in Wales
Constituencies established in 1999